Kothali is a village in Shirol Tehsil, Kolhapur district in Maharashtra state, India, situated  on the bank of the Krishna river. It is notable for agricultural production. It is one of the oldest village in Maharashtra as per one research. It is banked on river Krishna and Waarana.

People
Kothali's population is around 15,000. The native people of this village very kind and many are devotees of various temple / God. 
There is primary school and one secondary school in the village. The students educated from village are in all fields like engineer, doctor, Farmer, teacher, advocate, Businessman.

Economy
Kothali is noted for the cultivation of tomatoes and for sugarcane production. Grapes, vegetables, and flowers are also grown.

Transportation
Recently, roads were constructed from Kothali to neighboring villages. Travel to Kothali by water is also possible as it is situated on the banks of the Krishna river and small boats are available for travelling on the river.

References

Villages in Kolhapur district